Biddulph is a town in England.

Biddulph  may also refer to:

 Biddulph (surname)
 Baron Biddulph
 Biddulph baronets
 Biddulph Recordings
 Lucan Biddulph, Ontario, township